Rashid Sumaila (born 18 December 1992) is a Ghanaian professional footballer who plays for Muaither as a centre-back and he is also a member of the Ghana national team.

Sumaila won the 2011 Ghana Best Defender Award at the end of the 2010–11 Glo Premier League season.

Clubs career

Astronomers to Venomous Vipers and Ebusua Dwarfs
Born in Cape Coast, Rashid Sumaila, affectionately known as Rash, began his playing career in the junior ranks of Cape Coast Adisadel-based Colts team named Astronomers where he excelled with performance and won almost everyone's hearts at the club.

In the year 2008, a division 1 club Venomous Vipers who were monitoring him keenly had to approach management of Astronomers for his signature where he was their prime target for the 2008–2009 Division 1 season.

Playing with tenacity and zeal Sumaila was then tipped as the next Sergio Ramos of Ghana football due to his consistency in the central defensive role.

The praises and hails he had with the then division on club broke the news of his performances where Ghana Premier League Clubs were knocking heads to grab the young talented defender.

Prior to his abysmal performances  Premier League club Ebusua Dwarfs signed him for the 2009–10 season where he progressed through the ranks at Ebusua Dwarfs and made his senior debut in the 2010–11 Glo Premier League season.

Asante Kotoko
The porcupine worries in 2012 were very full of joy when they signed their best man Sumaila from Ebusua Dwarfs who they were eyeing season ago to strengthen their central defense.

As versatile as he was he played an integral part of Asante Kotoko S.C.  2012–13 season where he helped them to win the Ghana Premier League.

Notable for his tackles and strength in defense Sumaila's name was on everyone's lips of Asante Kotoko S.C. fans as he was referred as “We got our man” simply meaning they have fixed the defense now. French club RC Lens took an interest in young powerful centre-back after his first Ghana national football team call-up on 15 November 2011.

Mamelodi Sundowns
Rashid arrived for the Masandawana boys from Asante Kotoko S.C. for a permanent deal where he had already won the Ghana Premier League with the Porcupine worries.

His arrival saw a massive turn around at Mamelodi Sundowns F.C., he was very influential in the defence and played almost every match of the season where he helped them win the 2013–14 Premier Soccer League (PSL)  with them.

Asante Kotoko (loan)

Sumaila returned to Kotoko on a loan deal the following season from Mamelodi Sundowns F.C. but unfortunately the Ghana Premier League was hit with setbacks and was on hold so he returned to the Mamelodi Sundowns F.C.

Qadsia Sc
The Kuwaiti side Qadsia had earlier approached Mamelodi Sundowns F.C. for a loan fee of Sumaila where initially he had returned from Kototo as the Ghana Premier League was not in progress so he landed up in Kuwait to sign a loan deal with Qadsia SC with an option to buy.

He did offer his best to the Yellow Castles as they are called and helped them win the Kuwait Emir Cup for the 2014–15 season and by his hard works and dedication, he individually received the best Foreign Player in the Kuwait Premier League and Best Player of Qadsia SC respectively. As the 2015-2016 Season began Rashid Sumaila had already put pen to paper for an undisclosed fee and had established himself the preferred central defender in the team.

The season was getting better and better for Sumaila as the winning kept on coming which saw them be the favourite for the League title, their efforts and cohesive play did not end up in vain and was one that got their hands for the trophy, they announced the Kuwait Premier League champions for the 2015–16 season.

Al Gharafa
Sumaila was a hot cake in the Middle East where clubs where chasing here and there so Al-Gharafa SC was fortunate enough to get a loan deal of him from their sister country Kuwait side Qadsia SC.

What Sumaila brought there was passion and composure to the team, He was the deal and was ready to bring the team back on track so the 2016–17 season saw him outstanding in  yellow and blue shirt no wonder he was voted club best player at the end of the season.

Plans were, however, in advance to get him a permanent deal but Qadsia SC would not turn their attention either as they needed him back to complete his missions so Sumaila returned to his mother club to start the 2017–18 Kuwait Premier League season with the yellow castles.

Return to Qadsia Sc
Sumaila returned to his mother club Qadsia SC to begin the 2017–2018 Kuwait Premier League as an enforcer to the team.

The season was going to be a good one the Yellow Castle where Sumaila produced one of his best season performances from defending to scoring some important few goals to push the team forward. Sumaila was yet fortunate again to win the 2017-2018 Kuwait Crown Prince Cup beating their neighbors and rivals Kuwait SC in the final.

Red Star Belgrade
The quest for European football has always been the dream for Sumaila and a couple of them were knocking at his doors knowing the performances he had put in the seasons so far. On 28 June 2018 Sumaila joined the Serbian club Red Star Belgrade on one-year loan deal.

International career

Youth 
Sumaila was part of the Ghana national under-20 football team at the 2011 African Youth Championship. Sumaila was a member of the Ghana national under-23 football team that won Ghana's first All-Africa Games football gold medal in the Football at the 2011 All-Africa Games when they defeated South Africa national under-23 football team 4–2 on penalty shoot-out at the Estádio do Zimpeto in Maputo, Mozambique on 17 September 2011.

Senior 
On 7 November 2011 Sumaila was called up to the Ghana squad to face Sierra Leone national football team and Gabon national football team.

In December 2011, Sumaila was named to the Ghana national football team's provisional 25-man squad for the 2012 Africa Cup of Nations, but was not included by the Ghana national football team technical staff for the tournament's final 23-man squad.

Sumaila who was in form at Mamelodi Sundowns F.C. caught the attention of coach Kwesi Appiah and was called to 2014 FIFA World Cup squad for Ghana as the final 23 squad list was announced. Ghana could not progress from the group stages but were the only team that the Germany national football team could not beat in the tournament though they were the champions of the tournament. Ghana held them to a 2–2 draw which was one of the famous matches of the tournament.

Honours
Asante Kotoko
Ghana Premier League: 2012–13

Mamelodi Sundowns
Premier Soccer League: 2013–14

Qadsia SC
Kuwait Emir Cup: 2014–2015 
Kuwait Premier League: 2015–2016 
Kuwait Crown Prince Cup: 2017–2018

Red Star Belgrade
Serbian SuperLiga: 2018–19

Ghana U23
All-Africa Games Gold medal: 2011
Individual
  Ghana Premier League Best Defender: 2010–11
 Ghana Premier League Best Defender: 2012–13
Ghana MTN FA Cup Best Defender: 2012–2013
 Kuwait Premier League Best Foreign player: 2014–15
 Kuwait Premier League Best Defender: 2015–16 
 Qadsia SC Best Player of the season: 2014–15
 Al-Gharafa SC Best Player of the season: 2016–17

References

External links
 Rashid Sumaila at National-Football-Teams.com
Sumaila keen on impressing with Black Stars – MTNFootball.co

1992 births
Living people
Association football central defenders
Ebusua Dwarfs players
Ghanaian footballers
Asante Kotoko S.C. players
Ghana Premier League players
Mamelodi Sundowns F.C. players
Qadsia SC players
Al-Gharafa SC players
Muaither SC players
2014 FIFA World Cup players
Ghana international footballers
African Games gold medalists for Ghana
African Games medalists in football
People from Cape Coast
Qatar Stars League players
Qatari Second Division players
Red Star Belgrade footballers
Expatriate footballers in Serbia
Competitors at the 2011 All-Africa Games